Bahadır Han Güngördü (born 16 January 1996) is a Turkish football player who plays as a goalkeeper for Ankaragücü.

Professional career
Güngördü is a youth product of the academies of Çorum Gençlerbirliği and Kardemir Karabükspor, signing his first professional contract with the latter in 2015. He transferred to Trabzonspor on 28 July 2016. He began his senior career on loan with Ankara Demirspor in 2016where he spent three seasons, and then had a stint as the starter on loan at 1461 Trabzon for the 2018-19 season. His contract was mutually terminated with Trabzonspor on 28 June 2016. On 4January 2021, he transferred to Boluspor signing a 2.5 year contract where he was the backup goalkeeper. He spent the 2021-21 season in a return season with Ankara Demirspor, where he made 12 appearances in the league. He moved to Ankaragücü on 6 July 2021. He helped Ankaragücü win the 2021–22 TFF First League and earn promotion into the Süper Lig, playing in the last 2 matches that clinched the trophy. He made his professional debut in the Süper Lig with Ankaragücü in a 0–0 tie with Konyaspor on 8 August 2022.

Personal life
Güngördü was married on 24 June 2022 to Rümeysa Çetinkaya.

Honours
Ankaragücü
TFF First League: 2022–23

References

External links
 
 

1996 births
Living people
People from Çorum
Turkish footballers
Trabzonspor footballers
Ankara Demirspor footballers
1461 Trabzon footballers
Boluspor footballers
MKE Ankaragücü footballers
Süper Lig players
TFF First League players
TFF Second League players
TFF Third League players
Association football goalkeepers